Remake is the soundtrack from the film of the same name, released in 2003 by Gramofon. Unless noted, the cues were composed by Adi Lukovac feat. Emina Zečaj. The song  is sung by Mario Drmać, who performed it in the film as character Remzo.

It is the best-selling movie soundtrack of ex-YU cinema and one of the best-selling movie soundtracks of European cinema.

Track listing

References

External links
Track list at discogs.com

2003 soundtrack albums
War film soundtracks